This article displays the rosters for the participating teams at the 2011 FIBA Africa Championship.

Group A

Head coach:

Head coach:

Head coach:  Iñaki Garcia

Head coach: John Lucas

Group B

Head coach:  Michel Gomez

Head coach: Patrick Maucouvert

Head coach:

Head coach: Moustapha Gaye

Group C

Head coach: Lazare Adingono

Head coach: Jacques Monclar

Head coach:  Miodrag Perisic

Head coach:

Group D

Head coach: Adel Tlatli

Head coach: Veceslav Kavedzija

Head coach: Adel Tlatli

Head coach: Adel Tlatli

See also
 2011 FIBA Africa Clubs Champions Cup squads

References

External links
Official Site

2011 squads
squads